David Fraizer Bush (March 20, 1895 - May 28, 1975) served in the California State Senate for the 22nd district from 1931 to 1935. During World War I he served in the United States Army.

Honors 
Marshall Scholarship

References

External links
Join California David Bush

United States Army personnel of World War I
1895 births
1975 deaths
Republican Party California state senators
20th-century American politicians